Hydroxylamine-O-sulfonic acid (HOSA) is the inorganic compound with molecular formula H3NO4S that is formed by the sulfonation of hydroxylamine with oleum.  It is a white, water-soluble and hygroscopic, solid, commonly represented by the condensed structural formula H2NOSO3H, though it actually exists as a zwitterion and thus is more accurately represented as +H3NOSO3−.  It is used as a reagent for the introduction of amine groups (–NH2), for the conversion of aldehydes into nitriles and alicyclic ketones into lactams (cyclic amides), and for the synthesis of variety of nitrogen-containing heterocycles.

Preparation 
According to a laboratory procedure hydroxylamine-O-sulfonic acid can be prepared by treating hydroxylamine sulfate with fuming sulfuric acid (oleum). The industrial process is similar.

(NH3OH)2SO4 + 2SO3 → 2H2NOSO3H + H2SO4

The sulfonation of hydroxylamine can also be effected with chlorosulfonic acid by a method first published in 1925 and refined for Organic Syntheses.

Structure 
Analogous to sulfamic acid (H3N+SO3−) and as is the case generally for amino acids, HOSA exists in the solid state as a zwitterion: H3N+OSO3−.  It resembles an ammonia molecule coordinate covalently bonded to a sulfate group.

Reactions 
HOSA reacts under basic conditions as nucleophile and under neutral and acid conditions as electrophile.

Aminations

It reacts with tertiary amines to trisubstituted hydrazinium salts and with pyridine to the 1-amino pyridinium salt.

From 1-aminopyridinium salts the photochemically active 1-N-iminopyridinium ylides are accessible by acylation. The photochemical rearrangement of the obtained 1-N-iminipyridinium ylides leads in high yields to 1H-1,2-diazepines

N-amination of 1H-benzotriazole with hydroxylamine-O-sulfonic acid yields a mixture of 1-aminobenzotriazole (major product) and 2-aminobenzotriazole (minor product).  From 1-aminotriazole, benzyne is formed in an almost quantitative yield by oxidation with lead(IV) acetate, which rapidly dimerizes to biphenylene in good yields.

Electron deficient heterocycles, such as tetrazole, can be N-aminated with hydroxylamine-O-sulfonic acid, while even more electron-deficient compounds, such as 5-nitrotetrazole, react only with stronger aminating agents such as O-tosylhydroxylamine or O- mesitylene sulfonylhydroxylamine to amino compounds, which were investigated as explosives.

In the N-amination of the unsubstituted tetrazole, a mixture of 1-amino- and 2-aminotetrazole is obtained.

Also sulfur compounds (such as thioethers) can be aminated with hydroxylamine-O-sulfonic acid to sulfinimines (isosteric with sulfoxides but far more unstable) or phosphorus compounds (such as triphenylphosphine) can be aminated to phosphine imides via the intermediate aminotriphenylphosphonium hydrogen sulfate.

The reaction of hydroxylamine-O-sulfonic acid with metal salts of sulfinic acids in sodium acetate solution produces primary sulfonamides in very good yields.

Diimine can formed in situ from hydroxylamine-O-sulfonic acid respectively hydroxylamine-O-sulfonic acid hydroxylamine sulfate mixtures, which hydrogenates selectively conjugated multiple bonds.[20]

With carbonyl compounds 

At room temperature and below, hydroxylamine-O-sulfonic acid reacts with ketones and aldehydes as a nucleophile to the corresponding oxime-O-sulfonic acids or their salts. The oxime-O-sulfonic acids of aldehydes react above room temperature upon elimination of sulfuric acid in high yields to nitriles.

Aliphatic ketones provide under similar conditions in very high yields oximes, arylalkyl ketones react in a Beckmann rearrangement to amides. When heated to reflux for several hours under acidic conditions (e.g., in the presence of concentrated formic acid) alicyclic ketones react to provide lactams in high yields.

Under basic conditions in the presence of primary amines, hydroxylamine-O-sulfonic acid forms with aldehydes and ketones (e.g. cyclohexanone) diaziridines, which can easily be oxidized to the more stable diazirines.

The reaction also provides substituted aziridines from simple aldehydes and ketones with high yield and diastereoselectivity.

1,2-Benzisoxazole is efficiently produced by nucleophilic attack of hydroxylamine-O-sulfonic acid to the carbonyl group of 2-hydroxybenzaldehyde followed by cyclization.

1,2-Benzisoxazole is a structural element in the antipsychotic risperidone and paliperidone, as well as the anticonvulsant zonisamide.

In a one-pot reaction, N-aryl[3,4-d]pyrazolopyrimidines are obtained in good yields from simple 4,6-dichloropyrimidine-5-carboxaldehyde,

which can be used as purine analogs for a wide range of diagnostic and therapeutic applications.

Further reactions 
The chemiluminescence of the system luminol/cobalt(II) chloride is dramatically enhanced by the addition of hydroxylamine-O-sulfonic acid.

References 

Hydroxylamines
Sulfonic acids
Reagents for organic chemistry